Cozmâncă is a Romanian surname. Notable people with the surname include:

Octav Cozmâncă (born 1947), Romanian politician
Sebastian Cozmâncă (born 1992), Romanian Muay Thai kickboxer

Romanian-language surnames